MotionBuilder is a 3D character animation software produced by Autodesk. It is used for virtual cinematography, motion capture, and traditional keyframe animation. It was originally named Filmbox when it was first created by Canadian company Kaydara, later acquired by Alias and renamed to MotionBuilder. Alias in turn was acquired by Autodesk.

It is primarily used in film, games, television production, as well as other multimedia projects.

At SIGGRAPH 2012, Autodesk announced a partnership with Weta Digital and Lightstorm Entertainment to develop the next generation of the technology.

Features 
 Facial and skeletal animation
 Support for motion capture devices
 A software development kit that exposes functionality through Python and C++ via Qt and PySide.
 Ragdoll physics
 Inverse kinematics
 3D non-linear editing system
 Direct connection to other Autodesk digital content creation tools
 The FBX (.fbx) file format for 3D software interoperability has grown out of this package

See also
Autodesk Maya
Autodesk 3ds Max
Blender (software)

References 

3D graphics software
Autodesk products
Proprietary software that uses Qt
Proprietary commercial software for Linux